The Austria Billie Jean King Cup team represents Austria in Fed Cup tennis competition and are governed by the Osterreichischer Tennisverband.  They currently compete in the Europe/Africa Group I.

History
Austria competed in its first Fed Cup in 1963.  They have reached the semifinals on three occasions.

Current team (2020)
Melanie Klaffner
Mira Antonitsch
Julia Grabher
Sinja Kraus

External links

Billie Jean King Cup teams
Fed Cup
Fed Cup